The Conselh de la Lenga Occitana or CLO or Occitan Language Council is the body responsible for managing and developing the standard variant of the Occitan language. The council was founded in 1996 and 1997.

External links
 Occitan Language Council (official website)
 Preconizacions del Conselh de la Lenga Occitana (PDF), on  Gianni Vacca's website
 Preconizacions del Conselh de la Lenga Occitana (PDF) on Lingüistica Occitana, a review website
 Official recognition of CLO standard by the Aran Valley General Council (PDF)

Occitan language
Language regulators